The Greater Virgin Islands skink (Spondylurus spilonotus) is a species of skink found in the United States Virgin Islands.

References

Spondylurus
Reptiles described in 1837
Reptiles of the Caribbean
Endemic fauna of the Caribbean
Taxa named by Arend Friedrich August Wiegmann